How Did You Know is an extended play (EP) by Jamaican electronic dance musician Kurtis Mantronik. The EP was released in 2003 on the Southern Fried Records label, and features British singer Mim on vocals. "How Did You Know (77 Strings)" was released as a single from the EP, reaching number 16 on the UK Singles Chart and number three in Romania. The title track peaked atop the US Billboard Hot Dance Club Play chart in May 2004.

Track listing
 "How Did You Know (Radio Edit)" (Kurtis Mantronik, Miriam Grey - vocals) – 3:33  
 "How Did You Know (Original Vocal)" (Mantronik, Grey - vocals) – 6:35  
 "How Did You Know (Tony Senghore Vocal)" (Mantronik, Grey - vocals, Tony Senghore - remix) – 6:31  
 "77 Strings (Original Instrumental)" (Mantronik) – 7:57

Charts
The following chart entries are for "How Did You Know (77 Strings)".

Weekly charts

Year-end charts

Release history

References

External links
 

2003 EPs
2003 singles
Albums produced by Kurtis Mantronik
Southern Fried Records albums